Amanda Jane Camm (born 18 April 1979) is a member of the Parliament of Queensland representing the Liberal Nationals.

She first stood for the seat of Whitsunday as a member of Katter's Australian Party in the 2012 Queensland State election.

Camm was elected deputy mayor of the Mackay Regional Council in April 2016. She was a candidate for the Australian Senate in May 2019 but, being placed fifth on the LNP ticket, was not elected.

At the 2020 Queensland state election Camm defeated Jason Costigan in the seat of Whitsunday.

Her great-uncle was Ron Camm, a grazier who held the seat of Whitsunday for the National Country Party from 1961 to 1980.

References 

Living people
1979 births
Members of the Queensland Legislative Assembly
21st-century Australian politicians
Women members of the Queensland Legislative Assembly
Members of the Parliament of Queensland
Liberal National Party of Queensland politicians
21st-century Australian women politicians